Prescott (also known as The Lower Bottoms or The Bottoms) is a residential neighborhood and commercial district in West Oakland in Oakland, California.  The neighborhood boundaries are Mandela Parkway to the east, 7th Street to the south, West Grand Avenue to the north, and Frontage Road to the west.

History
The area was originally part of Oakland Point. It was a residential area of Victorian homes, many of which still stand, some in disrepair and some having undergone rehabilitation.

The neighborhood has suffered from high rates of crime, gang activity, and poverty since the decline of Oakland's industrial economy in the late 20th century. The neighborhood earned its nickname after the construction of the Cypress Freeway in the 1950s that split the West Oakland neighborhood in two and isolated Oakland Point from the remainder of West Oakland. The one housing project is Campbell Village Court.

Seventh Street was an African-American cultural center of Oakland from the 1940s to the 1960s, due to nightclubs such as Slim Jenkins' Place, Esther's Orbit Room and the Lincoln Theater, which drew top blues and jazz performers from across the United States. The area was sometimes referred to as "The Harlem of the West." The decline of Seventh Street has been blamed on the construction of the Cypress Freeway, the Oakland Main Post Office—and subsequent BART elevated track lines, which took up much of the street.

At the corner of Tenth and Center Streets, Huey P. Newton, founder of the Black Panther Party, was gunned down in an alleged failed drug deal on August 22, 1989.

Points of interest

Architectural landmarks 

16th Street Station is an abandoned Southern Pacific Railroad station and historical landmark located in the Prescott neighborhood of Oakland, California, United States. The Beaux-Arts building was designed by architect Jarvis Hunt, a preeminent railroad station architect, and opened in 1912. The station has not been served by trains since 1994, and is currently available as a rental space for private events through 2021. The station has also served as a film location for the 2005 film Rent and Vallejo rapper E-40's "Tell Me When to Go" video.

Performance arts 

Trapeze Arts is a performance arts school that teaches flying trapeze and other circus arts and is one of only a handful of full time circus schools in the United States.

Parks and green space 
Mandela Parkway is a major street and greenway in West Oakland that was created following the collapse of the Nimitz freeway Cypress Street Viaduct on October 17, 1989 during the Loma Prieta earthquake. American Steel Studios, Horn Barbecue, and the Cypress Freeway Memorial Park are all located on Mandela Parkway and its southern end goes right into the West Oakland BART Station.

Raimondi Park (aka “Ernie Raimondi Park”) is West Oakland's largest park 10 acres. It includes an Athletic Field located at 18th Street & Wood Street. Dedicated in 1947, the park was named in honor of Ernie Raimondi (1919–1945), a minor league baseball player and WWII veteran who grew up in Oakland. In September 2008, the first of two stages of a $7.2 million refurbishment of the park was completed. This included new drainage systems for the playing fields.

Transportation and BART station redevelopment 

The West Oakland BART station is located in Prescott, on 7th Street, and is one stop from downtown Oakland and downtown San Francisco. All lines except the orange line stop at the station.

In June 2020, the BART Board of Directors approved a mixed-use housing and commercial development at the West Oakland BART station that will include 762 housing units, 30 percent of which will be designated as affordable, 50,000 square feet of retail space, 300,000 square feet of office space and various amenities such as wider sidewalks and more crosswalks for pedestrians.

Community organizations
Several community organizations are based in Prescott, including the Lower Bottoms Neighborhood Association, the Prescott-Joseph Center, UNIA, Alliance for West Oakland Development, Prescott-Oakland Point Neighborhood Association, and the Lower Bottom Playaz theater troupe. Commercial outlets like City Slicker Farms, Revolution Cafe, Bikes 4 Life, and Mo Better Foods serve the community. In 2006, a locally owned full-service cooperative grocery store named Mandela Foods Cooperative (member of the Network of Bay Area Worker Cooperatives) opened in West Oakland, providing residents access to fresh produce, and focusing on nutritional education and affordable foods grown locally.

Political representation
The entire neighborhood lies within the boundaries of Oakland's Downtown-West Oakland District 3 City Council seat.

References

Neighborhoods in Oakland, California